Pusiola unicolor is a moth in the subfamily Arctiinae. It was described by Sergius G. Kiriakoff in 1954. It is found in the Democratic Republic of the Congo.

References

Moths described in 1954
Lithosiini
Moths of Africa
Endemic fauna of the Democratic Republic of the Congo